Pierre-Christian Taittinger (5 February 1926 – 27 September 2009) was a French politician, mayor of the 16th arrondissement of Paris between 1989 and 2008 and Senator for Paris between 1977 and 1995. After studying law he became a lawyer in 1947 and was elected as a municipal councillor for Paris in 1953 and remained so until his death in 2009.

He was the son of Pierre Taittinger founder of the champagne producing company Taittinger  and the brother of Jean Taittinger both of whom were also politicians.

References

1926 births
2009 deaths
Mayors of arrondissements of Paris
20th-century French lawyers
Collège Stanislas de Paris alumni
Rally for the Republic politicians
Union for a Popular Movement politicians
Burials at Passy Cemetery
Councillors of Paris